Pathalapattai  is a village in Tiruchirappalli taluk of Tiruchirappalli district in Tamil Nadu, India.

Landmarks 
Two rivers namely "Kallanai Kaalvaai" and " Vennar" are located in Indalur. There is a very famous Karuppu Swamy Kovil. There are nearly about 10 temples around there.

Demographics 

As per the 2001 census, Pathalapattai had a population of 2,740 with 1,351 males and 1,389 females. The sex ratio was 1028 and the literacy rate, 77.72.

References 

 

Villages in Tiruchirappalli district

Transportation 
The nearest railway station is Solagampatti (SGM). Frequent buses are available to Thanjavur, Thiruchhirappalli, Karur, Pudukkottai, Madurai, Chennai and Cochin.